The 96th Street station is a local station on the IND Eighth Avenue Line of the New York City Subway. Located at West 96th Street and Central Park West on the Upper West Side, it is served by the B on weekdays, the C train at all times except nights, and the A train during late nights only.

History 

The station opened on September 10, 1932, as part of the city-operated Independent Subway System (IND)'s initial segment, the Eighth Avenue Line between Chambers Street and 207th Street. Construction of the whole line cost $191.2 million (equivalent to $ million in ). While the IRT Broadway–Seventh Avenue Line already provided parallel service, the new Eighth Avenue subway via Central Park West provided an alternative route.

In 2019, the Metropolitan Transportation Authority announced that the station would become ADA-accessible as part of the agency's 2020–2024 Capital Program.

Station layout

This underground station has two levels with northbound trains using the upper level and southbound trains using the lower level. Each level has one side platform to the west of two tracks.

The platforms have no trim line, but name tablets read "96TH ST." in white sans-serif font on a midnight blue background and black border. "96" signs in the same format as the directional signs run along the platform walls at regular intervals at the same level as the name tablets. Blue columns run along both platforms at regular intervals with alternating ones having the standard black station name plate in white numbering.

Exits
All fare control areas are on the upper level platform and two staircases, one adjacent to each area, go down to the lower level. The full-time one at 96th Street is at the center of the platform. A staircase of four steps go down to a bank of three turnstiles that lead to a token booth. The other fare control area at 97th Street, at the station's extreme north end, is unstaffed, containing High Entry/Exit Turnstiles. The northwest staircase was relocated with a longer passageway due to the widening of 97th Street.

Two staircases connect the two platforms. There are currently three exits to the following locations:
Southwestern corner of West 96th Street and Central Park West.
Both western corners (one staircase each) of West 97th Street and Central Park West.

Directional signs that have been covered indicate that there was a third set of exits that led to both western corners (one staircase each) to West 95th Street. Further evidence of this exit's existence includes new tiling with doorways that lead to converted storage spaces on both levels. This exit was closed by 1940 and possibly as early as November 1932 - just two months after the opening of the station - due to frequent vandalism.

References

External links 

 
 Station Reporter — B Train
 Station Reporter — C Train
 The Subway Nut — 96th Street Pictures 
 96th Street entrance from Google Maps Street View
 97th Street entrance from Google Maps Street View
 Platform from Google Maps Street View

IND Eighth Avenue Line stations
Eighth Avenue (Manhattan)
New York City Subway stations in Manhattan
Railway stations in the United States opened in 1932
Upper West Side
Central Park
1932 establishments in New York City